The 2010 Rally Catalunya was the twelfth and penultimate round of the 2010 World Rally Championship season. The rally took place over 22–24 October 2010, and was based in Salou, the second biggest city in the Province of Tarragona in Catalonia. The rally was also the sixth and final round of the Junior World Rally Championship.

After claiming the world championship at the previous round in France, Sébastien Loeb won the 61st WRC rally of his career by leading from start to finish. Second was Petter Solberg with Loeb's team-mate Dani Sordo completing an all-Citroën podium. Loeb's victory ensured that the marque's C4 would finish with a perfect record on asphalt, with it not being beaten on any WRC rally on the surface since its début in 2007.

Despite being forced to return under Superally conditions, Aaron Burkart won the JWRC championship title after Hans Weijs Jr. was slowed by a crankshaft sensor issue on the second run through El Priorat.

Results

Event standings

Special stages

Standings after the rally

Drivers' Championship standings

Manufacturers' Championship standings

References

External links 
 The official website of the World Rally Championship
 Results at eWRC.com

Catalunya
Rally Catalunya
Catalunya Rally